Thunderhead Mountain is a  mountain in the west-central part of the Great Smoky Mountains, located in the Southeastern United States.  Rising along the border between Tennessee and North Carolina, the mountain dominates the Western Smokies.  The Appalachian Trail crosses its summit, making it a popular hiking destination.  Rocky Top, a knob on the western part of the mountain's summit ridge, shares its name with a popular Tennessee state song.

The mountain's name originated in the 19th century. It probably referred to the unpredictable weather that often strikes the higher elevations in the Smokies.  According to Laura Thornborough, a writer who hiked to the summit of Thunderhead along with local guide Sam Cook in the 1930s:

Geology 
Thunderhead consists of precambrian sandstone.  Thunderhead sandstone is part of the Ocoee Supergroup, which was formed from ancient ocean sediments between 500 million and one billion years ago. The mountain itself was formed appx. 200 million years ago during the Appalachian orogeny, when the collision of the North American and African plates thrust the rock upward.

History 

James Spence, who cleared the ridge  to the west (now known as Spence Field), was the first known permanent settler in the vicinity. While the extent of Spence's farm is unknown, cattle-grazing had rendered Thunderhead a grassy bald by the late-19th century.

Thunderhead is one of the few mountains listed under its current name in  Arnold Guyot's 1859 survey of the crest of the Smokies.

During the Civil War, a group of East Tennesseans attempted to form a wilderness settlement on the mountain's north slope known as "New World," although the settlement didn't last.  The settlement was located along Thunderhead Prong, near Chimney Rocks.

As preservationist groups began buying land in the Smokies in the early 1900s, Thunderhead became a favorite hiking destination for park visitors.  John W. Oliver, the great-grandson of the first European settlers in Cades Cove, started offering guided hikes to the
mountain in 1924.  The trail he (and Thornborough's guide, Sam Cook) used largely followed the Bote Mountain Trail-Appalachian Trail route still in use today.

In the years after the Great Smoky Mountains National Park was formed, wooded plants started to reclaim much of the Smokies crest west of Clingmans Dome.  Park strategy at present is to allow Thunderhead to return to its natural state.  A narrow path is maintained across the top of the mountain for Appalachian Trail thru-hikers.

Access 

The Bote Mountain Trail, with its trailhead on Little River Road, ascends  to the crest of the Smokies and intersects the Appalachian Trail at Spence Field. The Lead Cove Trail, also beginning on Little River Road (near Cades Cove), offers the shortest access to the summit by bypassing the first  of the Bote Mountain Trail. The Anthony Creek Trail, rising out of the Cades Cove campground, also bypasses the first  of the Bote Mountain Trail.

While the main summit of Thunderhead is covered in foliage, Rocky Top offers a 360-degree view of the western Smokies.

References

External links

Great Smoky Mountains National Park Trail Map
Thunderhead Mountain - Peakbagger.com
Hiking information for Rocky Top and Thunderhead
Great Smoky Mountains National Park Landforms

Mountains of Great Smoky Mountains National Park
Mountains on the Appalachian Trail
Mountains of Tennessee
Mountains of North Carolina
Protected areas of Blount County, Tennessee
Protected areas of Swain County, North Carolina
Appalachian balds
Mountains of Swain County, North Carolina
Mountains of Blount County, Tennessee